David Darlow may refer to:
* David Darlow (film producer) (born 1942), British film producer and director
 David Darlow (actor) (born 1943), American actor and stage director